Azeglio  is a comune (municipality) in the Metropolitan City of Turin in the Italian region Piedmont, located about  northeast of Turin.

Azeglio borders the following municipalities: Bollengo, Palazzo Canavese, Piverone, Albiano d'Ivrea, Viverone, Caravino, Settimo Rottaro, and Borgo d'Ale.

Main sights
It is home to one or more prehistoric pile-dwelling (or stilt house) settlements that are part of the Prehistoric Pile dwellings around the Alps UNESCO World Heritage Site.

References

Cities and towns in Piedmont
Canavese